Chamaemelum is a small genus of plants in the daisy family commonly known as chamomiles or dogfennels. Perhaps the best-known species is Roman chamomile, Chamaemelum nobile. These are annual or perennial herbs, rarely exceeding half a meter in height and usually bearing solitary white daisylike flowers with yellow centers. They are native to Europe but most species can be found scattered in other continents where they have been introduced.

Species

Chamaemelum fuscatum (Brot.) Vasc. - dusky dogfennel - Spain, France, Italy, Portugal, Channel Islands (UK), Malta, Tunisia, Algeria, Morocco
Chamaemelum nobile (L.) All. - Roman chamomile - much of Europe, Western Asia, and North Africa from Azores + Ireland to Algeria + Kazakhstan

References

External links

 Jepson Manual Treatment

Anthemideae
Asteraceae genera
Taxa named by Philip Miller